The .30 Winchester Center Fire cartridge was first marketed for the Winchester Model 1894 lever-action rifle in 1895. The .30-30 (pronounced "thirty-thirty"), as it is most commonly known, along with the .25-35 Winchester were offered that year as the United States' first small-bore sporting rifle cartridges designed for smokeless powder. Since its introduction, it has been surpassed by many cartridges in the long-range shooting attributes of speed, energy, and trajectory, yet remains in widespread use because of its practical effectiveness in forested hunting situations.

The .30-30 is by far the most common cartridge shot from lever action rifles. The .30-30 is substantially more powerful than the Magnum handgun cartridges (e.g., .357, .41, .44, etc.) also often paired with lever actions, and produces that energy with mild recoil. While its old rival .35 Remington produces more muzzle energy and recoil, the .30-30 will often retain more terminal energy. The .30-30 is not commonly used for extreme long-range shooting across wide-open spaces, but modern innovations in ballistic tipped bullets for leverguns have moved the long-range capabilities of the .30-30 somewhat closer to parity with higher-velocity cartridges. In any case, a hunting-specific advantage of the .30-30 over those cartridges is that it leaves lower volumes of spoiled (destroyed or bloodshot) venison after a kill, leading to less waste.

Naming 
The .30 Winchester Smokeless first appeared in Winchester's catalog No. 55, dated August 1895. When chambered in the Winchester Model 1894 carbine and rifle, it was also known as .30 Winchester Center Fire or .30 WCF. When the cartridge was chambered in the Marlin Model 1893 rifle, rival gunmaker Marlin used the designation .30-30 or .30-30 Smokeless. Both Marlin and Union Metallic Cartridge Co. also dropped the Winchester appellation, as they did not want to put the name of rival Winchester on their products.

The modern designation of .30-30 Winchester was arrived at by using Marlin's variation of the name with the Winchester name appended as originator of the cartridge, but .30 WCF is still seen occasionally.

Characteristics and use 

When the .30 WCF was introduced, it was seen as fast and flat-shooting: 160 or 165 grains at 1,900 to 2,000 fps and a 4 inch drop at 200 yards if sighted in for 150 yards. The cartridge's common loads are a 150 grain bullet (MV 2,390 fps from a 24-inch barrel) and 170 grain (MV 2,200 fps from a 24-inch barrel).

In Canada and the U.S., the cartridge has likely, at some point, been used on all big game species.  More recently, it has been used on whitetail, mule deer, pronghorn, caribou, elk, moose, and black bear. It is commonly said that in the U.S. and Canada more deer have been killed with the .30-30 than with any other cartridge, and perhaps this was true for a time in the U.S. It is unlikely to be true in Canada where, for a period, military surplus rifles in .303 British were widely available and used; they were cheaper than lever-action rifles and the cartridge was more powerful than the .30-30. The .30-30 is commonly seen as usable on deer up to 150 to 200 yards.

In Canada the .30-30 has a long history of use on moose—one writer calling it "a standby for moose" in Canada's northern forests. In some circles it continues to be used, yet modern opinions on its suitability for moose are mixed: Paul Robertson, a Canadian hunting firearms columnist, says, "Too many moose have been taken with the 30/30 to rule it out as good for this purpose as well." However, while the .30-30 is legal for hunting moose in Newfoundland, Canada, provincial authorities do not recommend its use.  The cartridge, with flat- or round-nosed bullets in standard loadings, does not meet minimum energy standards required for moose hunting in Finland, Norway, or Sweden. Thor Strimbold, a Canadian who has made more than 20 one-shot kills on moose with a .30-30, advises most moose hunters to use more than minimal power if they can handle the recoil. It is generally agreed that the .30-30 is not a good choice for hunters who wish to shoot animals at longer ranges. Hunting technique and style, as well as law and culture, influence cartridge choices.

One reason for the .30-30's popularity among deer hunters is its light recoil. Among some hunters, though, the .30-30 has been replaced by cartridges such as the .243 Winchester, 7mm-08 Remington, and 6.5 Creedmoor, which also offer light recoil along with more speed, energy, and a flatter trajectory.

For a period of time the Model 94 in .30-30 was relatively inexpensive, which helped its popularity. Today the cost of a .30-30 is matched by some entry-level bolt-action sporting rifles. The .30-30 remains popular, though, among some hunters who value a short, handy rifle used at ranges that will likely not exceed 150 yards (137 meters). Mlllions of rifles have been produced in this caliber, with many passed on to a new generation of hunters. The practicality of hunting with an inherited rifle and cartridge, especially if the combination has been seen as effective at modest range, is an important factor in some circles. The widespread availability of .30-30 loads, which can cost less than some other calibers, is another factor. New rifles continue to be purchased and cartridge sales are strong.

Because the majority of rifles chambered in .30-30 are lever-action rifles with tubular magazines, most .30-30 cartridges are loaded with round-nose or flat-nose bullets for safety. This is to prevent a spitzer-point bullet (the shape seen on the 7.62×51mm NATO above) from setting off the primer of the cartridge ahead of it in the magazine during recoil, resulting in potentially catastrophic damage to both firearm and shooter. The Savage Model 99 was introduced in 1899 with a rotary magazine, in part, to avoid that issue. When used in single-shot rifles or handguns, such as the Thompson Center Arms Contender or Encore series, it is common for shooters to hand load the cartridge with spire-point bullets for improved ballistics.

A notable exception to the "no pointed bullets" guideline for bullet selection in rifles with tubular magazines are the new flexible "memory elastomer"-tipped LEVERevolution cartridges as produced by Hornady. The soft tips of these bullets easily deform under compression, preventing detonations while under recoil in the magazine, yet also return to their original pointed shape when that pressure is removed, thus allowing for a more efficient bullet shape than previously available to load safely in such rifles. The more aerodynamic shape results in a flatter bullet trajectory and greater retained velocity downrange, significantly increasing the effective range of rifles chambered for this cartridge.

Rifles and handguns chambered in .30-30 
The .30-30 is by far the most common chambering in lever-action rifles, such as the Marlin Model 336 and Winchester Model 1894. Some earlier Savage Model 99 rifles were chambered for this cartridge. Current production lever-action rifles include those by Marlin, Mossberg, Henry, and Winchester. Savage also produced a pump-action Model 170, both rifle and carbine, that was available in .30-30. In Europe the .30-30 was occasionally used in a drilling, a three-barrelled firearm (one rifle barrel on top of two shotgun barrels).

The rimmed design is well suited for various single-shot actions, so it is commonly found there, as well. Rimmed cartridges are chambered in bolt-action rifles, but .30-30 bolt actions are uncommon today. "At one time Winchester turned out the Model 54 bolt-action repeater in this caliber [.30 WCF], but it was a decided failure, chiefly because the man desiring a bolt action preferred to use one of the better and more powerful cartridges. However, in this particular caliber, the .30 WCF cartridge proved to be decidedly accurate." In addition, rimmed cartridges typically do not feed well with the box magazines normally found on bolt-action rifles. Other examples of bolt-action rifles offered in .30-30 Winchester are the Stevens Model 325, the Savage Model 340, the Springfield/Savage 840, and the Remington 788.

In the sport of handgun metallic silhouette shooting, the .30-30 has been used. The Thompson Center Arms Contender pistol, with its compact frame and break-action design, is available for the .30-30 cartridge. The .30-30 will produce velocities of nearly 2000 f/s (610 m/s) out of the 10-in (25-cm) Contender barrel, though recoil and muzzle blast are stronger due to the short barrel. The longer barrel results in significant reductions in felt recoil (due to increased weight) and muzzle blast, with higher velocities, especially if factory-loaded rifle ammunition is used. Magnum Research offers their five-shot BFR revolver in .30-30. In the U.S., some handgun hunters use the 30-30. Hunting with a pistol is not permitted in Canada.

As a parent case
In 2023, Remington introduced a new SAAMI-approved cartridge using the .30-30 Winchester as a parent case. The new cartridge, the .360 Buckhammer, or .360 BHMR for short, is based on a .30-30 Winchester case that has been blown out to get rid of the shoulder and necked up to accommodate .358-caliber bullets (the same bullets used in the .35 Remington). The .360 Buckhammer operates at higher pressure than the .30-30 Winchester, at 50,000 psi for the .360 Buckhammer versus 42,000 psi for the .30-30 Winchester. The .30-30 Winchester is also the parent case for the .25-35 Winchester (6.5×52mmR), .32 Winchester Special, and .219 Zipper.

Derivative cartridges 
In addition to the most common factory derivations, the .25-35 Winchester (6.5×52mmR) and .32 Winchester Special, and the less-known .219 Zipper, the .30-30 has also spawned many wildcat cartridges over the years. One example is the 7-30 Waters, made by necking the .30-30 case down to 7 mm (.284 in). The 7-30 Waters eventually moved from a wildcat design to a factory chambering, with rifles being made by Winchester, and barrels made by Thompson/Center for their Contender pistol. Other .30-30-based wildcats are used almost exclusively in the Contender pistol. One of the more notable examples is the .30 Herrett, a .30-30 case necked back to reduce case capacity for more efficient loading with fast-burning powders. The .30 Herrett produces higher velocities with less powder than the larger .30-30 case in the short 10- and 14-in (25- and 35-cm) Contender barrels. Other examples are the .357 Herrett, developed to handle heavier bullets and larger game than the .30 Herrett, and the 7 mm International Rimmed, a popular metallic silhouette cartridge. Bullberry, a maker of custom Contender barrels, offers proprietary .30-30 wildcats in 6 mm, .25 caliber, and 6.5 mm diameters. In addition, P.O. Ackley used the cartridge as the basis for the .30-30 Ackley Improved.

See also 
 .300 Savage
 .360 Buckhammer
 7 mm caliber
 Table of handgun and rifle cartridges

References

External links 

 Chuck Hawks article on the .30-30
 Leverguns.com history of the .30-30

30-30
Pistol and rifle cartridges
Rimmed cartridges